Gil Island may refer to:

Gil Island (Canada)
Gil Island (Azerbaijan)